The 1880–81 season was the tenth season of competitive football in England.

International matches
England played their first home match outside London when they hosted Wales at Alexandra Meadows in Blackburn.

* England score given first

Honours

Notes = Number in parentheses is the times that club has won that honour. * indicates new record for competition

References

External links